Barrelfish is an experimental computer operating system built by ETH Zurich with the assistance of Microsoft Research in Cambridge. It is an experimental operating system designed from the ground up for scalability for computers built with multi-core processors with the goal of reducing the compounding decrease in benefit as more CPUs are used in a computer via putting low level hardware information in a database, removing the necessity for driver software.

The partners released the first snapshot of the OS on September 15, 2009 with a second being released in March, 2011. Excluding some third-party libraries, which are covered by various BSD-like open source licenses, Barrelfish is released under the MIT license. Snapshots are regularly released, the last one dating to March 23, 2020.

While originally being developed in collaboration with Microsoft Research, it is now partly supported by Hewlett Packard Enterprise Labs, Huawei, Cisco, Oracle, and VMware.

See also 

 Singularity
 Midori

References

Further reading

External links 
 Barrelfish.org
 Project Paper - "The Multikernel: A new OS architecture for scalable multicore systems" (PDF file)

Free software
Distributed operating systems
Microkernel-based operating systems
Microkernels
Microsoft free software
Microsoft operating systems
Microsoft Research
Software using the MIT license
2009 software